Duddilla Sridhar Babu is an Indian politician from Indian National Congress and is a member of the Telangana Assembly. He was a member of the Andhra Pradesh Legislative Assembly, representing the Indian National Congress. He was the Minister for Civil Supplies, Consumer Affairs, Legal Metrology and Legislative Affairs in the Government of Andhra Pradesh prior to that state being divided. He is now the MLA from Manthani Constituency, which he won in the 2018 Assembly Elections in Telangana. This is his fourth term as MLA. Sridhar Babu is one of the senior most leaders in the Telangana Congress Party.Sridhar Babu is an AICC All India Congress Committee Secretary attached to the AICC General Secretary, incharge of Karanataka as of July 2022.

Background
Duddilla Sridhar Babu is the fourth of six children of former Speaker of the Andhra Pradesh Assembly, the Indian National Congress politician Sri D. Sripada Rao. He graduated from the University of Delhi and was a practising lawyer at Andhra Pradesh High Court before entering politics in 1999 following the assassination of his father by Naxalites. At that time he decided that it was incumbent on him to continue the work of his father in the Manthani constituency and more specifically in the Karimnagar district in which it is situated.

A keen cricketer as a student — he represented Nizam College and the University of Hyderabad —  Sridhar Babu is married to Ms Shailaja Ramaiyer, an officer in the Indian Administrative Service of the Telangana Cadre, while being a MLA. The couple have two children.

Career
Sridhar Babu is known for carrying out developmental works in the Backward region of Manthani ever since he became a Member of the Legislative Assembly and is believed to be always close to the people of the region.

First term (1999–2004)
Sridhar Babu won on the Congress ticket from Manthani in the 1999 elections, though his Congress party was relegated to sitting in the opposition. He defeated his nearest rival,  by a margin of over 15,000 votes.

Second term (2004–2009)
By the time Y. S. Rajasekhar Reddy undertook his padayatra in 2003, Sridhar Babu was the Karimnagar district party president. In the 2004 elections, in which the Congress Party gained power, he defeated the TDP candidate, Somarapu Satyanarayana, by a margin of 42,560 votes. He became a Government Whip in the 12th Andhra Pradesh Legislative Assembly.

Third term (2009–2014)
He was re-elected in the 2009 Assembly Elections defeating Putta Madhu of the erstwhile Praja Rajyam Party by a margin of over 13,000 votes. He was the only Congress MLA to be re-elected in 2009 from Karimnagar district, amidst a strong showing from an alliance of the Telangana Rashtra Samithi and Telugu Desam Party.

Babu was appointed a member of Y. S. Reddy's cabinet in May 2009 as minister for Higher Education and NRI affairs. After serving the ministry for 1.5 years he moved to the Civil Supplies and Legislative affairs ministry in Kiran Kumar Reddy's cabinet. He resigned from the cabinet on 2 January 2014 after Reddy divested him of his Legislative Affairs portfolio when the Andhra Pradesh Reorganisation Bill, which concerns the creation of a separate Telangana state, was being discussed in the Assembly.

Fourth term (2018–Present)
Sridhar Babu won a hard-fought election in 2018, and won with a majority of 16,230 votes against his TRS rival. The Telangana CM KCR had called for an early election in September 2018 by dissolving the assembly a good 8 months before its tenure throwing the opposition parties into a tizzy. The Congress party had high hopes of dethroning the ruling TRS and allied itself with the TDP, TJS and CPI to forge a grand alliance. However, the TRS rode back to power and Sridhar Babu was one of the only 19 MLAs who won on the Congress party ticket.

Election statistics

Offices held

References

Indian National Congress politicians from Andhra Pradesh
Living people
Delhi University alumni
Telugu politicians
Members of the Andhra Pradesh Legislative Assembly
Year of birth missing (living people)
Telangana MLAs 2018–2023